Borje may refer to:

 Börje, Swedish name
 Börje, a parish in the former Ulleråker Hundred of Sweden
 Borje (Foča), village in Bosnia and Herzegovina
 Borje, Zagorje ob Savi, small settlement in Slovenia
 Borje pri Mlinšah, small settlement in Zagorje ob Savi municipality, Slovenia (not to be confused with previous Borje)
 Borje, Croatia, village near Kalnik, Koprivnica-Križevci County, Croatia
 Borje, Albania, village near Shishtavec, Kukës County, Albania